Gary S. Lachman is an American author, international lawyer, fishing boat captain, and former Portfolio Manager for the U.S. Department of State. Formerly a resident of Istanbul, Turkey, Lachman currently resides in Palm Beach County, Florida.

Biography
Born in New York City, Lachman was raised in Scarsdale, New York, before moving to North Carolina to attend college at Duke University.  Upon graduation, he continued his education at University of Denver College of Law where he received his Juris Doctor. He remained in Denver and practiced real estate law there until 2006. Opportunity presented a move to the Washington D.C. area where Mr. Lachman developed Lake Arbor, one of the first large-scale master planned communities in suburban D.C. Upon completion of the development of Lake Arbor, Mr. Lachman established Thoroughbred Homes, and built many high-end production and luxury custom homes in the Washington, D.C. suburbs between 1991 and 1997. As a private developer he developed over 50 million square feet of residential land and buildings.

Mr. Lachman accepted a position with the U.S. Department of State as International Real Estate Portfolio Manager and leader of the New Embassies and Consulates group at the Bureau of Overseas Buildings Operations. He negotiated and managed the development of projects above €800 million globally and was responsible for the negotiation and acquisition of 40 new embassies and consulates worldwide. He is remembered at the State Department for, among other things, his interesting approach to international negotiation. In one former Soviet state, he negotiated the acquisition of a crucial security setback property in exchange for a Barbie doll and a Tonka truck.

Lachman spent 2006 - 2014 practicing international law with a focus on mergers and acquisitions in Istanbul, Turkey. He represented a number of US public companies in connection with their establishment of subsidiaries in Turkey and entering into joint ventures with Turkish companies. In the course of his law practice, he became an expert on the advantages of situating foreign companies in Turkish Free Trade Zones.

Mr. Lachman served as an associate professor of International Real Estate at the Johns Hopkins University, Edward St. John real estate program at the Carey Business School teaching a graduate level course in International Real Estate Investment and Development in Emerging Markets.  He also taught business communication and law classes at Koç University in Istanbul and was a lecturer on cross cultural communication and negotiation in the College of Business Administration at Kuwait University. Lachman was a contributing journalist for the Hürriyet Daily News & Economic Review with weekly columns – "The Consultant's Corner" and "The Law Office" - and is the author of the book Real Estate Investment, Development, and Law in Emerging Markets originally published by PEI Media. For a number of years, Mr. Lachman taught a seminar on negotiation techniques at The Jagiellonian University in Kraków, Poland for their American Law program. as well as serving as an International Real Estate Consultant to the Ministry of Foreign Affairs of the Government of the Republic of Poland.  He assisted with their acquisitions and disposals of diplomatic facilities in the U.S. and throughout the world.

In addition to business, Mr. Lachman was an avid and nationally ranked polo player.  In 1980, he founded the Perkins Shearer/Denver Symphony Annual Polo Cup in connection with his tenure as a member of the Board of Trustees of the Denver Symphony Orchestra. Lachman organized and played in what originated as a single match and grew into an annual tournament that raised hundreds of thousands of dollars for the Denver Symphony Orchestra.  Unbeknownst to its current organizers, this event grew into what is now called the Denver Polo Classic, a major fundraiser for children's' charities. Lachman maintains solid ties to Duke University, having served on several of the Advisory Boards, including the Board of Visitors of the Duke University Medical Center, the Duke Heart Board, and the Duke Eye Center. He combined his involvement with Duke and his teaching background with Johns Hopkins 2000–2006 by providing college counseling to foreign students wishing to attend university in the United States. Gary is currently continuing his support of classical music by serving on the Board of Directors of Palm Beach Symphony. (https://www.palmbeachsymphony.org/about/board-of-directors)

Gary Lachman is Of Counsel in Greenspoon Marder's West Palm Beach, Florida office where he works as the senior real estate and M&A lawyer. His practice focuses on international mergers & acquisitions, asset protection, and real estate law.

Gary holds a USCG Merchant Mariners OUPV Captains License and ran deep sea fishing charters with Blue Devil Sportfishing (http://www.bluedevilfishing.com) for many years in Palm Beach County, Florida.  He and his partners now run a tournament charter fishing team out of West Palm Beach.  He is passionate about maintaining healthy pelagic fish stocks along Florida's Atlantic coast and he and his team conduct frequent ocean trash removal exercises between Delray Beach and Jupiter, Florida.

Publications

Books
 Friendshipping, (2020 Page Publishing)https://www.amazon.com/Friendshipping-Gary-S-Lachman/dp/1662418094/ref=sr_1_1?dchild=1&keywords=friendshipping+gary+lachman&qid=1608409941&sr=8-1   
Real Estate Investment, Development, and Law in Emerging Markets, (2010: PEI Media Publications) 
 Beating the Alternative, (2010: Amazon Press) 
 "The Squid Hunters", (2012: Amazon Press)

Articles

"Real Estate Leases in Turkey", Hurriyet Daily News and Economic Report  Saturday, October 17, 2009
"Real estate risk/return disconnect in Turkey", Hurriyet Daily News and Economic Report  Thursday, March 25, 2010
"Acts of God", Hurriyet Daily News and Economic Report Saturday, September 19, 2009
"Istanbul Still Attracts Real Estate Investment", Hurriyet Daily News and Economic Report July 11, 2009
"Mergers & Acquisitions: A corporate dating game", Hurriyet Daily News and Economic Report July 18, 2009
"Turkey's Turtle Rescuers", November 17, 2009, Didem Today
"The Fate of the US Dollar", Hurriyet Daily News and Economic Report Saturday, October 31, 2009
"The U.S. "Immigrant Investor" Visa", Hurriyet Daily News and Economic Report  Friday, November 20, 2009
"The Future of Golf in Turkey", Hurriyet Daily News and Economic Report  Thursday, October 1, 2009
"Where can you find justice? Saturday", Hurriyet Daily News and Economic Report  September 5, 2009
"How culture can affect communication", Hurriyet Daily News and Economic Report  Friday, August 21, 2009
"Saving the Marine Environment; One Turtle at a Time" Hurriyet Daily News and Economic Report  Saturday, August 8, 2009
"Proximate cause, foreseeability and Istanbul ferries" Hurriyet Daily News and Economic Report, Monday, June 22, 2009
"THE LAW OFFICE: Foreign Banks' Representative Offices" Hurriyet Daily News and Economic Report Saturday, October 18, 2008
"THE LAW OFFICE: Vultures in the American Skies" Hurriyet Daily News and Economic Report  Saturday, October 11, 2008
"THE LAW OFFICE: Recent Developments in Competition Law" Hurriyet Daily News and Economic Report Saturday, October 4, 2008
"THE LAW OFFICE" Threat to new real estate law, Hurriyet Daily News and Economic Report, Saturday, September 27, 2008
"THE LAW OFFICE: Market hurricane largely misses Turkey", Hurriyet Daily News and Economic Report Saturday, September 20, 2008
"THE LAW OFFICE: New law restricts real estate for foreigners", Hurriyet Daily News and Economic Report  Saturday, September 13, 2008
Roubini Global Economics
"High-flying Development May Bring Istanbul Crashing Down", April 3, 2010, Hurriyet Daily News and Economic Report
"Weak pound hits Britons overseas home purchases", March 9, 2010, Hurriyet Daily News and Economic Report
"US developer diplomat eyes law in Turkey", Saturday, September 20, 2008, Hurriyet Daily News and Economic Report

References

Living people
Lawyers from New York City
Year of birth missing (living people)
Writers from New York City